Gagik Hovunts (1 March 1930 – 1 September 2019)  was an Armenian composer, born in Yerevan. He started his music education at the Alexander Spendiaryan Music School. In 1954 he graduated from the Yerevan Komitas State Conservatory, the class of violin with Karp Dombaev, and in 1957 - the class of composition with Grigor Yeghiazaryan. He was a professor at the Yerevan Komitas State Conservatory from 1984 onwards.

References

External links
 Gagik Hovunts

1930 births
2019 deaths
Armenian composers
Komitas State Conservatory of Yerevan alumni
Academic staff of the Komitas State Conservatory of Yerevan
Musicians from Yerevan